Yeet may refer to:

 Koe Yeet (born 1992) Malaysian actress
 Yeet, a video game character from the 1991 game Boppin'
 Eat Yeet, a video game character from the 2006 game Blue Dragon (video game)

See also

Yeate
Yate (disambiguation)
Yet (disambiguation)